Balls Deep is the second album from the Portsmouth, New Hampshire rock band Scissorfight. The album was also the band's second, and final release under Wonderdrug Records. At which time the group switched over to Tortuga Recordings for their third album New Hampshire. The song "Human Head" was released as a single on 7-inch vinyl.

Track listing 

 "Drunken Hangman" - 2:20
 "Human Head" - 2:30
 "The Gibbetted Captain Kidd" - 2:56
 "Scarecrow Season" - 1:50
 "Curse of the Returned Astronaut" – 4:17
 "Quantrill’s Raiders" - 2:30
 "Infuriator" - 3:38
 "Lunatic Yankee Spectre" - 2:50
 "Stove by a Whale" – 4:01
 "Balls Deep" – 1:51
 "Kancamagus Mangler" – 2:28
 "Cramp" - 2:16
 "Scream of the Wendigo" – 7:31

Personnel 
 Ironlung – vocals 
 Jay Fortin – guitar
 Kevin J. Strongbow – drums 
 Paul Jarvis – bass guitar

References

External links 
 Scissorfight Official Website
 Scissorfight on Facebook
 Wonderdrugs Records Official Website

1998 albums
Scissorfight albums